Xinhua Township is a township of Tengchong County in western Yunnan province, China, located about  south of the county seat and  southwest of Baoshan as the crow flies. , it has 11 villages under its administration.

References 

Township-level divisions of Baoshan, Yunnan